"World of Magic" is a song recorded by German Eurodance act Pharao, which consists of Indian/German singer Kyra Pharao and American rapper Deon Blue. It was released in 1995 as the third single from their debut album, Pharao (1994), and was a top 20 hit in Finland, peaking at number 13. Additionally, it reached the top 30 in both Sweden and Germany. On the Eurochart Hot 100, the single peaked at number 97 in April 1995.

Music video
A music video was produced to promote the single, directed by John Clayton. He also directed the video for the act's first single, "I Show You Secrets".

Track listing
 CD maxi
"World of Magic" (Magic Radio/Video Mix) – 3:59
"World of Magic" (Land Of Unity Mix) – 5:38
"World of Magic" (Wizard Mix) – 5:53
"World of Magic" (Witchcraft Rave Mix) – 5:52 

 CD maxi - Remixes
"World of Magic" (Dance Radio Version) – 3:44
"World of Magic" (Summer Radio) – 3:56
"World of Magic" (Radio Version) – 3:43
"World of Magic" (Unicorn Radio Mix) – 3:36
"World of Magic" (Trip To Wonderland) – 5:29
"World of Magic" (Magical Summer) – 5:40
"World of Magic" (Fantasy Mix) – 5:13
"World of Magic" (Unicorn Mix) – 5:23

Charts

References

 

1995 singles
1995 songs
Dance Pool singles
English-language German songs
Music videos directed by John Clayton
Pharao songs